Kelawei Road is a major thoroughfare in the city of George Town in Penang, Malaysia. It is one of the main roads leading out of the city centre to the suburbs, stretching from the heart of George Town towards Pulau Tikus. This leafy road runs just behind Gurney Drive, passing by a number of well-known landmarks and shopping malls; the high-rises of Gurney Drive also line the northern side of Kelawei Road.

As with Burmah Road, Kelawei Road passes through the suburb of Pulau Tikus, thus it has witnessed significant Eurasian, Thai and Burmese influences. A Eurasian community still resides along Kelawei Road to this day, forming the Penang Eurasian Association.

Etymology 
There are conflicting accounts on how Kelawei Road got its name. Kelawei Road was purportedly named after the first river estuary west of George Town, which was then named 'Kuala Awal'.

Another account stated that Kelawei Road was named after a Malay settlement that once existed at the road, and that the term 'Kelawai' actually referred to the roots of Myxopyrum nervosum, also known as 'pokok kelawai' in Malay. The Malay fishing village was, in turn, named 'Tanjong Kelawai', which gradually evolved into the current name of the road, Jalan Kelawei.

History 
Kelawei Road has been populated by Burmese, Eurasian and Thai communities throughout its history. In particular, the mainly Catholic Eurasians built the Church of the Immaculate Conception, as well as the Catholic Cemetery along Kelawei Road. The College General, a training institution for Catholic missionaries, also once stood along the road, before being relocated to Tanjung Bungah.

Meanwhile, two Buddhist temples along Kelawei Road serve as reminders of the Thai and Burmese presence along the road. The Dhammikarama Burmese Temple was established by ethnic Burmese who had moved into the area in the late 18th century, with the temple being built in 1803. The Thais would later build Wat Chayamangkalaram on land donated to the Thai community by Queen Victoria in 1845.

Up until the 1930s, Kelawei Road was the coastal road that stretched along George Town's northern shoreline. Gurney Drive only came into existence with the completion of land reclamation works in the 1930s.

Today, the high-rises of Gurney Drive also have their rear entrances along Kelawei Road. The road has been made a one-way road since 2013.

Landmarks 
 Church of the Immaculate Conception
 Wat Chaiyamangkalaram
 Dhammikarama Burmese Temple

Shopping centres 
 Gurney Plaza
 Gurney Paragon

Hotels 
 G Hotel Kelawai
 Good Hope Hotel

See also 
 List of roads in George Town

References 

Roads in Penang
George Town, Penang